The Northern University Games (NUG) is an Australian inter-varsity multi-sport competition held annually in mid-year break (June/July in Australia) between universities and tertiary institutions from Queensland, Northern Territory and northern New South Wales. The games attract on average 600 competitors every year across seven different sports. It was first held in 2005.

Participants
In 2009, the following universities competed at the Games:
Australian Catholic University
Bond University
Central Queensland University
Griffith University
Griffith University, Gold Coast
Queensland University of Technology
Southern Cross University
The University of Queensland
University of Southern Queensland
University of the Sunshine Coast

Sport Results

Winners with an * denotes runners-up to a foreign touring team.

Australian Football

Baseball

Basketball

Golf

Hockey

Netball

Rugby League 7's

Rugby Union

Soccer

Squash

Tennis

Touch Football

Volleyball

Water Polo

External links
Official Website

Sport at Australian universities
Recurring events established in 2005